Das Boot is a German television series produced by Bavaria Fiction for Sky One and a sequel to the film of the same name. Based on Lothar-Günther Buchheim's book with additions from his sequel, Die Festung, the series focuses on events at sea in the Battle of the Atlantic on various U-boats, and on the resistance to German occupation on land, in France and Europe during World War II.

Plot 
The series picks up in late 1942, nine months after the events of the film. In season one, the narrative is split into two strands: one at sea, on board , and the other, on land, in La Rochelle, France, with the French resistance. The sea-land dual storyline continues in subsequent seasons, providing multiple points of view towards World War II. The second season takes place in 1943, following captain von Reinhartz of U-822 as he attempts to defect to America, while deposed captain Hoffmann of U-612 attempts to return to Germany. In season three, war continues to exert its forces on Europe in unexpected territories, namely neutral Portugal, and Kiel, Germany, home of the U-boats; while at sea, Robert Ehrenberg attempts to form a family and redemption with the crew of U-949 on a secret mission while Royal Navy Commander Swinburne pursues them towards the Southern Hemisphere.

Cast

Seasons 1–3

Season 4

Episodes

Season 1 (2018)

Season 2 (2020)

Production

Conception and development 
In June 2015, it was announced that a television series adaptation of the 1981 film, Das Boot, would be made. In July 2016, it was further announced that the series would be in eight parts, to be directed by Andreas Prochaska and produced by Bavaria Fiction, Sky Deutschland and Sonar Entertainment. The series was based on Lothar-Günther Buchheim's books, Das Boot (1973) and Die Festung (1995).

The director of season one, Andreas Prochaska, explained that it was important for the series to maintain the anti-war stance and "explore the perennial theme of what war does to people", but it would not be possible to sustain "the original film's relentless focus on a submarine crew ... over an eight-part TV series". Therefore, the decision by the creators and co-writers, Tony Saint and Johannes W. Betz, to set the series in late 1942, "after the Allies have cracked the German military's Enigma code and can track the movement of their submarine fleets", enabled a foretelling of the impacts of these events, not only upon the U-boat crews but also their loved ones and others connected to them. Prochaska discussed the series as "[going] a step further than the film did" by adding the Resistance storyline, stating, "[it] gives a chance to bring in strong female characters".

Casting 
The cast for season one, announced in September 2017, included Vicky Krieps, Tom Wlaschiha, Vincent Kartheiser, James D'Arcy and Thierry Frémont, Lizzy Caplan, Rick Okon, August Wittgenstein, Rainer Bock, Leonard Scheicher, Robert Stadlober, Franz Dinda, and Stefan Konarske.

In season two, Clemens Schick, Thomas Kretschmann, Michael McElhatton, Ulrich Matthes and Rochelle Neil joined the cast.

The new cast in season three included Ray Stevenson, Luise Wolfram, Elisa Schlott, Anna Schudt, Joana Ribeiro, Florian Panzner, Artjom Gilz, Jo Hartley, Fritzi Haberlandt, Johann von Bülow, Trystan Pütter, Franz Hartwig, and Ernst Stötzner who replaced Ulrich Matthes as Wilhelm Hoffmann. Jürgen Prochnow, who starred as U-boat Captain "Der Alte" ("Old Man") in the original film, was offered a role in the third season but turned it down.

Joining the cast season four are Sascha Geršak, Steffan Rhodri, Marco Leonardi, Wilson Gonzalez Ochsenknecht, Lara Mandoki, Stefan Murr, Benjamin Dilloway, Joshua Collins, and Rosalie Thomass, who replaces Luise Wolfram as Hannie Hoffmann Lessing.

Cinematography 
From 2020, the series is filmed in 8K resolution. Cinematographer Armin Franzen explains that an advantage of the larger 8K format is not having to use wide camera lenses such as the 21mm when shooting inside the small enclosed interiors of the submarine sets. By using longer focal lengths, such as the 29mm, 35mm and 50mm, the subjects are brought closer to the camera, thus allowing the audience to "be closer to the characters' emotions" as the tragedies of war mount.

Filming and locations 
Filming for season one started on 31 August 2017 and finished after 105 days on 20 February 2018. The budget was 33 million euro (USD 39 million). In December 2018, plans for a second season were announced. Malta, Germany (Munich), France (La Rochelle) and Czech Republic (Prague) were chosen for the location shooting.

Filming for season two began in April and completed in July 2019, taking place again again in Malta, Prague and La Rochelle, and a new location, England. In England, specifically, Liverpool and Manchester were used for the scenes set in New York. When the COVID-19 pandemic struck in 2020 and it was no longer possible for the production team to travel to the Prague studios, some of the post-production work, such as visual effects and sound mixing, were completed by the remote work arrangement.

In season three, Prague was the location for the exterior scenes set in Kiel and Liverpool, while Malta was used for the interiors of Lisbon and Liverpool.

For the fourth season, filming of the six episodes began in June 2022 and wrapped in September 2022. The locations for season four included Kalkara, Marsa and Kordin in Malta.

Languages 
With dialogue in German, French, English, Portuguese and Italian, the series features characters (e.g., Simone and Frank Strasser) who not only speak in multiple languages but also embody different language identities. German and British writers, Johannes W. Betz, Tony Saint, Colin Teevan and Judith Angerbauer, among others, collaborate to ensure that the nuances of the languages are appropriately translated and deployed.

Music 
For the opening theme, composer Matthias Weber added to composer Klaus Doldinger's anthem for the 1981 film "a simple piano" melody and "an underlying bass pulse". Working with director Andreas Prochaska in season one, their goal was to find a balance between the emotional and the abstract in order to express "a sense of loneliness" as well as "vast space". For the remainder of the score, Weber also wanted to achieve a contemporary feel in a similar way to Doldinger by employing only the sounds of the Haken Continuum without accompaniment and adding drone-like rhythms. After previewing the first episode of the series in 2018, Doldinger commented: "it was fascinating to see how the world of Das Boot is brought to life together with the play of images and Matthias Weber's interpretation of the main motif. I'm happy to be back on board Das Boot and compliments to Matthias Weber". The score for season one was nominated for the 2019 German Television Award for Best Music, and the score for season three won the 2022 Hollywood Music in Media Awards for Score - TV Show/Limited Series (Foreign Language).

Picture format and sound 
Das Boot is produced in 8K resolution and Dolby Atmos three-dimensional audio technology.

Submarines, replicas and emblems 
Like U-96, the featured submarine of the 1981 film, the U-boats in the series are also of the Type VIIC. The submarine used in filming the series was the non-diving replica built in Malta as the 'modified' S-33 for the film U-571, also shot in Malta. The replica is still afloat, moored at Cassar ship repair yard, Marsa, in the inner part of the Grand Harbour. A special rig was built for the production by a Maltese armoury team, that allowed the submarine's anti-aircraft gun to both fire and recoil, which had not been done before with a blank-firing gun.

The submarine set is designed by production designer Nick Palmer and is constructed in Barrandov Studios in Prague, Czech Republic. It is 45 metres long, 5 metres wide, filling up an area of 235 square metres, and able to simulate the motion of a submarine in water.

Like the iconic laughing swordfish (Der lachende Schwertfisch) emblem that adorned U-96 in the 1981 film, each featured U-boat in the series also bears an emblem on either side of the conning tower which represents, at times incongruously, the characters of the boat's captain and its crew. The emblem for Wrangel's U-113 is a skeleton; Hoffmann's U-612, a scorpion; Reinhartz's U-822, a falcon; Buchner's U-949, a sewer rat; and the boat scuttled by Swinburne, a fox.

Tropes 
The trope of the hunter becomes the hunted, a plot device that was used in the 1981 film, continues to be developed in the series. Other nautical fiction and non-fiction tropes include: mutiny, sailors' superstitions, Ahab-like obsessions, and the ones that are on film critic Anne Billson's list for the submarine screen genre, namely "claustrophobia, fire and flood, creaking hulls, dwindling oxygen, an unstable crew member, ... periscope POV, playing possum, depth charges, silent running", and frantic calls of "Alarm!"

Release

Broadcast 
The series premiered on 23 November 2018 on Sky One in Germany. The broadcast rights were sold to more than 100 countries before the series premiered. Outside Germany, it was broadcast on Sky Atlantic in the United Kingdom in February 2019, Hulu in the United States in June 2019, SBS in Australia, and TVNZ in New Zealand. Season three was originally scheduled to screen in Europe on 9 April 2022 but was deferred until 14 May 2022 out of consideration for the conflict in Ukraine.

Marketing 
According to Samsung, in 2020, "the series was the first native 8K produced TV series ... [to be] launched exclusively in 8K on Samsung TV Plus in Germany". In 2022, streaming for season three was available on Samsung QLED 8K SmartTVs via Sky Q in Germany.

Reception

Viewership 
For season one, it was reported in Europe that there were 1.44 million viewers on Sky Deutschland during the first month of screening, between 23 November to 16 December 2018, and an additional 2.8 million viewers on non-linear distribution platforms. Outside Europe, one source in the United States reported 1.13 million linear viewers and 1.89 million on-demand viewers.

Critical response 
On the review aggregation website Rotten Tomatoes, the series holds a "certified fresh" approval rating of 85% based on 34 reviews. The critics' consensus reads: "Das Boot possesses the atmospheric pressure of its cinematic forebear while adding new depth to its compelling ensemble, making for a riveting international production".

The reviews for season one from Germany were mixed. German historian, Sven Felix Kellerhoff, criticised the plot around the industrial family Greenwood and their financial ties with Nazi Germany as potentially relativising German guilt. Kathleen Hildebrandt from Süddeutsche Zeitung found the portrayal of the women to be rather clichéd, and the series could have been more relevant if it had not cared so much about getting good audience numbers. Thomas Klein from Berliner Zeitung noted that there were "no Nazis in Das Boot, no 'Heil Hitler', no staunch party members", and the series was more about the commercialisation of a famous brand.

Irish writer Colin Teevan, who became the lead writer of season two, found that "critics everywhere love the show, except in Germany" because, in Germany, the critics considered to be unacceptable the perspective that "Germany is not totally and wholly responsible, wrong and guilty".

Outside Germany, the reviews were more favourable. Some critics found season one to be "clever and utterly thrilling", season two, innovative in taking the WWII film and television genre to "somewhere new", and season three, sensitive to the grief that was experienced on both sides of the war. According to Adam Sweeting of i [newspaper], Das Boot stands apart from its predecessor by going beyond inducing the feeling of claustrophobia inside a submarine and offers instead a "satellite-vision scope". In season two, in particular, this perspective shows how the protagonists, von Reinhartz, Simone and Frank Strasser, and Margot Bostal, react to the pains of war and make compromises which they know to be "soul-destroying" in order to survive and stand up to the Nazis.

Anita Singh in The Telegraph gave it three out of five and was unimpressed by the plot.
Other reviews were also mixed, comparing it negatively with the original film. Prochnow said, "it has absolutely nothing to do with [the film]. Not even with Günther Buchheim's book... [This is] a completely different story and shouldn't be called ["Das Boot"] in my opinion".

Awards and nominations

Notes

References

External links 
 Official website
 

2018 German television series debuts
2020s German drama television series
German-language television shows
German military television series
World War II television drama series
Live action television shows based on films
Television sequel films
U-boat fiction
Television shows filmed in the Czech Republic
Television shows filmed in France
Television shows filmed in Germany
Television shows filmed in Malta